The 14th Cavalry Division (14-ya Kavaleriiskaya Diviziya) was a cavalry formation of the Russian Imperial Army.

Organization
1st Cavalry Brigade
14th Regiment of Dragoons
14th Uhlan Regiment
2nd Cavalry Brigade
14th Regiment of Hussars
14th Regiment of Cossacks
14th Horse Artillery Division

Commanders  
 18.10.1914—13.05.1915 : Ivan Erdélyi

Commanders of the 1st Brigade
1880–1882: Alexander Kaulbars

References

Cavalry divisions of the Russian Empire
Military units and formations disestablished in 1918